Building blocks of Bharat is a television series produced by Vigyan Prasar and telecast on a number of channels including Rajya Sabha TV in India. This 13-part series which focuses on India's architectural marvels from ancient, medieval to the designing of Lutyens' Delhi. This series takes the viewer across India through the eyes of its anchor, Arjun Bhagat, who is a journalist and amateur history and science buff. The series covers over 70 major monuments many of them World Heritage Sites. The uniqueness of the show is its focus on understanding India's architectural skills  through the ages and the in-depth knowledge of the builders be it climatic conditions, the terrain, tools and material they used to create what are some of the most sophisticated architectural monuments and engineering skills on planet earth. The series is directed by Arjun Bhagat and Radhika Chandrashekar. And the series is by IMAK News & Entertainment Private Limited for Vigyan Prasar.

Episodes

External links
 First episode

Architecture in India